Boiken (Nucum, Yangoru) is one of the more populous of the Ndu languages of Sepik River region of northern Papua New Guinea. It is spoken around Boiken Creek in Yangoru-Saussia District, East Sepik Province and adjacent islands off the north coast of northern Papua New Guinea.

Phonology

References

External links 
 Paradisec houses two collections of Arthur Capell's materials that include Boiken (AC1 and AC2) as well as notes from Don Laycock's work (DL2) all of these collections are open access.

Languages of East Sepik Province
Ndu languages